Sutherland Shire is a local government area in the southern region of Sydney, in the state of New South Wales, Australia. Sutherland Shire is colloquially known as "The Shire" and has featured in several reality television series.

Geographically, it is the area to the south of Botany Bay and the Georges River.

The administrative centre of the local government is located in the suburb of Sutherland, with council chambers located in Eton Street. As of 10 January 2022 the Mayor of the Sutherland Shire is Cr. Carmelo Pesce, a Liberal.

The Shire contains what was the first landing site of Lieutenant James Cook, who went ashore onto what is now the suburb of Kurnell on 29 April 1770. It was originally intended to be the site of the first British Settlement, before Sydney Cove was chosen as the location during the First Fleet.

Suburbs and localities in the Shire 

{
  "type": "ExternalData",
  "service": "geoshape",
  "ids": "Q1818997"
}
Suburbs in Sutherland Shire are:

Localities and features within Sutherland Shire include:

Demographics 

Aboriginal and/or Torres Strait Islander people made up 1.1% of the population. The median age of people in Sydney - Sutherland (Statistical Area Level 4) was 40 years. Children aged 0 – 14 years made up 19.1% of the population and people aged 65 years and over made up 16.9% of the population. Of people in Sydney - Sutherland (Statistical Area Level 4) aged 15 years and over, 53.7% were married and 10.4% were either divorced or separated.

The median weekly income for residents within Sutherland Shire was higher than the national average.

The most common ancestries in Sydney - Sutherland (Statistical Area Level 4) were English 27.6%, Australian 26.3%, Irish 9.5%, Scottish 6.9% and Italian 3.2%.  In Sydney - Sutherland (Statistical Area Level 4), of occupied private dwellings 4.6% had 1 bedroom, 21.1% had 2 bedrooms and 35.5% had 3 bedrooms. The average number of bedrooms per occupied private dwelling was 3.2. The average household size was 2.7 people.

Council

Current composition and election method
Sutherland Shire Council is composed of fifteen Councillors elected proportionally as five separate wards, each electing three Councillors. All Councillors are elected for a fixed four-year term of office. The Mayor is elected by the Councillors at the first meeting of the council. The most recent election was held on 4 December 2021, and the makeup of the council is as follows:

As of December 2021, the new makeup of the council is expected to be Liberal: 8, Labor: 5, and 2 independents.

The current Council, elected in 2021, in order of election by ward, is:

History

Aboriginal heritage 
The original inhabitants of the area  of Sutherland Shire were some clans of the Dharawal people. Archaeological work in the Shire has revealed evidence for Aboriginal settlement dating back at least 8,500 years. The original coastline around Sydney has retreated about 20 km and that those flooded coastal plains may hold evidence showing occupation of this area going back well beyond the 8,500 years revealed in the 1966 Archaeological exploration.

Seashells became an important source of lime in the 1800s and so many middens in the Shire may have been mined for shells.

Within the Royal National Park, field surveys have revealed many hundreds of Aboriginal rock shelters. In other locations (The Military Area near Holsworthy and Darkes Forrest) there are thousands of sites, camping areas and sacred places. These areas mentioned have not been affected greatly by European occupation and building and may give a clearer example for the quality of life and abundance of resources in Sutherland/Liverpool areas.

Since 1966 when there was an archaeological dig in Cabbage Tree Basin archaeologists have uncovered parts of an extensive open-air midden or cooking and camp sites. Successive layers of habitation show the diet of the native Aborigines: oysters, mussels, snapper, bream, and Sydney cockle. There is also evidence of seal, dolphin, a range of marsupials, dingo and even whale. Several edge-ground axes have also found.

There are many existing sites where paintings and engravings of great age show changes in art style over thousands of years. Some of these changes can be linked to the extinction of some animals in the area and also with the coming of Europeans to Sutherland. Some have interpreted these changes in style to changes in culture and people which would indicate that there have been a number of changes of communities over time.

European settlement 

European discovery of what is now Sutherland Shire was made by Lieutenant James Cook, who entered Botany Bay on 29 April 1770. Cook and his party explored around Kurnell Peninsula, and left the bay on 6 May. During their brief stay, a Scottish seaman named Forbes Sutherland died of tuberculosis. In his honour, Cook named the northwest point of the peninsula Point Sutherland.

The British government needed a new site for transported convicts as they had lost their American colonies following defeat in the American Revolutionary War. Botany Bay was chosen as the new penal settlement and the First Fleet under Governor Arthur Phillip anchored off Kurnell on 18 January 1788. After sending a party to clear land for settlement, Phillip soon realised the area was unsuitable. There was lack of shelter for ships, inadequate water and poor soil. On 24 January, two French ships were sighted off the coast, causing Phillip to raise English colours near Sutherland Point. Governor Phillip sailed north to explore Port Jackson, and eventually settled at Sydney Cove.

The first landowner in Sutherland Shire was James Birnie, a mercantile trader who was granted by promise  at Kurnell in 1815. After the completion of official surveying, a large part of what is now Sutherland Shire was proclaimed as the Hundred of Woronora by Governor Richard Bourke in 1835. Title to land was not granted by the Crown until 1856, before which there was practically no settlement. Timber cutting was the primary industry, supplemented by shell gathering in the Port Hacking area.

With the opening of Crown Lands sales in the Shire, Thomas Holt purchased . His developmental projects included oyster farms, cattle grazing, and coal mining. The investment which proved profitable however, were his timber leases. He constructed a magnificent manor on the foreshores of Sylvania, called Sutherland House, based on English feudal lines. Due to 99-year leases, Holt's estate reduced development in the Shire even into the 20th century.

Development of transport 

The main mode of transport in the area was originally by water. Farmers' ships sailed up the coast into Botany Bay, and up the Georges and Woronora rivers, avoiding the wharfage and custom dues at Port Jackson. The first public road, the Illawarra Road (now called the Old Illawarra Road) to the "Five Islands" (now Wollongong), was constructed between 1842 and 1845 with convict labour. A new southern line of road was completed in 1864, linking up with the Illawarra Road at Engadine. Today this virtually is the line of the Princes Highway, the main north–south thoroughfare through Sutherland Shire.

A railway line was extended from Hurstville in 1884 to develop the rich Illawarra district. The railway brought into being firstly a huge shanty town on the heights of Como, and later developed the area into a holiday centre. Sutherland railway station was opened in 1885, named after John Sutherland, a Minister of Works during the 1870s who had argued most forcefully for the railway.

At this time, the greater part of the Shire was connected only by access tracks. A road soon opened between the railway station and Cronulla Beach, catering mostly to families and fishing parties. This was followed by the Sutherland-Cronulla steam tram service, which was inaugurated in 1911. Not only did the service greatly increase the popularity of the Cronulla beaches, but it was of great advantage to the slowly developing business interests in the Shire.

Increasing motor traffic caused a falling-off of passengers and the tram passenger service closed in 1931. The goods service ceased the following year. Increased road traffic with the north led to the opening of the first road bridge into the Shire, at Tom Ugly's Point, in 1929. The six-lane Captain Cook Bridge over the Georges River, spanning Rocky Point and Taren Point, was opened in 1965, replacing the completely inadequate ferry service.

Residential development 

Coastal and river frontage areas, such as Como, Illawong, Cronulla, Illawarra and Yowie Bay, became popular as country retreats. A form of voluntary local government was attempted in 1888, but law and order was still administered by the court at Liverpool until 1905. In that year, the  provided that the whole of New South Wales be divided into shires. The State Governor, Harry Rawson selected the name, and proclaimed this district "Sutherland, No. 133" on 6 March 1906 and fixed the boundaries. At the time the Shire had 1600 residents, and it was divided into three Ridings.

With only a small rates base, one of the early problems for the council was the provision of new roads. The construction of the Sutherland-Cronulla tramway by the Railway Commissioner went far in stimulating business activity and driving land sales. The population of the Shire increased from 2,896 in 1911, when the tramway opened, to over 7,500 in 1913. By 1931 the population had exceeded 12,000.

After the Second World War, the Housing Commission, under the auspices of William McKell, began acquiring land to build "homes for heroes", including in the Shire. It was not until the early 1950s that this district of scattered dwellings, vacant blocks and quiet villages became a suburban area of Sydney. Until this time Sutherland Shire was not considered part of Sydney.

Associated with this growth of population was industrial, social and commercial development. The Sutherland Shire Libraries system was established in 1953 in a former doctor's home at Sutherland with 8,000 books.  The Captain Cook Drive from Caringbah to Kurnell was constructed in 1953 in conjunction with the establishment in 1956 of the Australian Oil Refinery at Kurnell. At Lucas Heights, the Australian Atomic Energy Commission (now the Australian Nuclear Science and Technology Organisation) built its research station complex in 1958.

In terms of residential development, one of the most imaginative homebuilding concepts has been Sylvania Waters. Here, individually designed family homes have been built around a series of man-made canals. The urban release of land in the Menai district, to the west of the Woronora River, commenced in the 1970s.

Contemporary history 

In January 1994, the 1994 Eastern seaboard fires destroyed parts of Como West, Jannali and Bonnet Bay; and affected the southern suburbs of Bundeena, Maianbar and Heathcote.

In December 2005, following incidents on Shire beaches culminating in an assault on a lifeguard by youth of Lebanese descent, an anonymous text message, publicised by major media outlets in Australia, called on people to gather at Cronulla beach on the following Sunday and attack "wogs and lebs". On 11 December 2005 and the days that followed, a series of riots and retaliatory attacks broke out in Cronulla and other beach-side suburbs in Sydney's east which saw numerous assaults. There were two non-fatal stabbings and property damage, especially to motor vehicles. There were many people arrested, over one hundred charged, and extensive national and international media interest.

The Sutherland Shire is home to a population of approximately 140 koalas, which are an endangered species.

Heritage listings 
Sutherland Shire has a number of heritage-listed sites, including:
 Audley, Sir Bertram Stevens & Audley Road: Audley historic recreational complex
 Caringbah South, 44-46 Fernleigh Road: Fernleigh, Caringbah South
 Cronulla, Captain Cook Drive: Cronulla sand dunes
 Cronulla, Cronulla railway: Cronulla railway station
 Cronulla, 202 Nicholson Parade: Cronulla Fisheries Centre
 Dolans Bay, 733 Port Hacking Road: Lyons House, Sydney
 Heathcote, 1-21 Dillwynnia Grove: Heathcote Hall
 Kurnell, Cape Solander Drive: Kamay Botany Bay National Park
 Loftus, Illawarra railway: Loftus Junction railway signal box
Woronora Dam (suburb): Woronora Dam

Geography 

Under the 1853 proclamation, the western boundary of district was the Woronora River. With the formation of The Council of the Shire of Sutherland in 1906, the western boundary was extended to take in more agricultural land in an area which is now modern day Menai. In 1919, the Illawong area was also transferred to the council.

The northern border of the Shire can be crossed via four bridges: three road bridges (Alfords Point, Sylvania Waters and Taren Point) and one railway bridge (Como). To the west, the Heathcote Road leading out of the Shire passes by the Holsworthy military reserve. To the south, the Princes Highway runs out of Waterfall towards the City of Wollongong. The eastern border is bounded by the Tasman Sea.

On the east the Shire has a varying landscape of rugged sea cliffs and sandy beaches, and swampy bay coasts backed by sand dunes. To the west the surface consists of a broad plateau rising gently to the southwest, and cut into by several deep river gorges.

Geology 

The geology of Sutherland Shire, whilst sharing characteristics with the North Shore, is very different from the western and central suburbs of Sydney. Above the coal-bearing rocks is found the Narrabeen Group, mostly made up of layers of sandstone and characteristic red claystone beds. Overlying the Narrabeen Group is the Hawkesbury Sandstone, the rock unit most characteristic of the Shire. Occasional patches of Ashfield shale overlay the Hawkesbury sandstone. Some time later than the Triassic period - possibly early Tertiary - minor volcanic activity occurred in the region. This took the form of intrusion of a number of dykes of basaltic rock which forced their way up through the sedimentary rocks. Due to the wetting and drying action of the weather the basaltic rock of the dykes has changed to clay.

From the end of the Triassic period to the middle of the Tertiary period, soft material was worn down or removed by wind and running water. In the final stages of this period of erosion the climate was apparently rather wetter and more humid than today's, causing the exposed rocks to change and form laterite soil, which is abundant in the Shire.

River system 

A little later in the Tertiary, tilting occurred south of the Georges River. The slow uplift, taking perhaps several million years, formed the present Woronora Plateau, a surface which rises gently in the south. This process caused the river system in the Shire to flow in steeper watercourses. They then became more active, carving the steep gorges of Woronora, Hacking, Georges Rivers and their tributaries which can be seen today. Waterfalls such as those at Waterfall and Undola also formed during this period. Water supplies within the shire are of two kinds. The main source is the surface supply provided by the Woronora Dam, which is built in the deep gorge of Woronora River. A second source exists in the form of underground water.

During the last ice age, the rivers had to do additional work cutting down through the rocks to reach the lower and more distant ocean, leading to the "valley-in-valley" shape of many of the deep gorges in the Shire. When sea levels rose again, the silt and sand carried by the rivers gradually built up a considerable thickness of sediment. Sediment filled the area between Kurnell (then an island) and Miranda. Sand dunes began to accumulate in the Kurnell area and the mud and sand flats of Quibray and Gunnamatta Bays began to form. The Kurnell sand dunes have provided a cheap source of sand for the southern suburbs of Sydney but in the process of exploitation this area has been robbed of its character and the removal of vegetation has opened the way to erosion.

Royal National Park 

The Premier John Robertson dedicated  to "The National Park" (now the Royal National Park), gazetted in 1879. This makes it the second oldest park of its kind in the world after Yellowstone National Park in America, although there is no public gazette record for Yellowstone until the 1880s, making a valid claim for The Royal National Park being the oldest in the world. Today it is just under . The National Park was given the prefix "Royal" after Queen Elizabeth visited the park in 1954.

Urban structure 
Sutherland Shire is now predominantly a residential area with commercial centres and minor industrial and rural areas. The commercial centres of the Shire are located in the suburbs of Sutherland, Miranda (home to a large Westfield shopping centre, traditionally known as Miranda Fair), Cronulla, Caringbah, Menai and Engadine. Sutherland Shire's old mantra was:
 Sutherland: "The centre of business".
 Miranda: "The centre of shopping"
 Cronulla: "The centre of leisure"

The Shire suburb of Kurnell, which includes the site of the first landing site of James Cook, was also the site of a former oil refinery.  Nearby is Towra Point Nature Reserve, a wetland of international importance. Australia's first and only nuclear reactor facilities are in the Shire suburb of Lucas Heights. The reactor, run by the Australian Nuclear Science and Technology Organisation (ANSTO) is not a power station but is used for the production of radiopharmaceuticals, for research and irradiation.

The isolated suburbs of Bundeena and Maianbar are situated on the southern shore of Port Hacking between the water and the Royal National Park. They are accessible by boat, including a regular ferry service from Cronulla to Bundeena or by road through the national park.

Significant parks and reserves 
 Caravan Head Bushland Reserve
 Royal National Park
 Towra Point Nature Reserve
 Joseph Banks Native Plants Reserve, Kareela

Facilities

Education 

There are now nearly 100 schools in the Shire including the Gymea and Loftus Colleges of Technical and Further Education, a technology high school (Gymea Technology High School), one of the ten academically selective high schools in New South Wales (Caringbah High School), a sports oriented high school (Endeavour Sports High School), more than twenty secondary schools, preschool centres, and special schools provided to serve children with specific learning needs.

Health 

The Sutherland Hospital and Kareena Private Hospital are both located at Caringbah and President Private Hospital is located in Kirrawee.

Transport 

The Shire is serviced by Transdev NSW bus services and Sydney Trains services on the Illawarra line.

Emergency services 

Fire and Rescue NSW has stations at Miranda, Sutherland, Cronulla, Engadine and Bundeena. The NSW Ambulance Service has stations at Caringbah (Sutherland Hospital), Engadine in the south and Menai in the west and Bundeena. Due to the large area designated as National Park and the prevalence of bushland in the area Sutherland Shire has 12 New South Wales Rural Fire Service stations. There are stations located at Bundeena, Engadine, Grays Point, Heathcote, Illawong, Kurnell, Loftus, Maianbar, Menai (currently relocating to Barden Ridge), Sandy Point, Waterfall and Woronora. These brigades attend fires, vehicle accidents, missing persons searches and community education days. Good coverage in the area from Fire and Rescue NSW also means that these Rural Fire Service members are regularly sent out of area to help the rest of New South Wales and on occasion interstate. The Shire also has a State Emergency Service unit based at Heathcote with facilities at Menai and shared facilities at Woronora.

Surf life saving and river life saving 

There are four surf life saving clubs, a surf life saving offshore rescue boat and Marine Rescue NSW base located at Cronulla and a river life saving club and Rural Fire Service and State Emergency Service boats located at Woronora. The clubs and boats provide life saving and first aid services to the many visitors to the Shire's beaches and rivers. The four surf clubs from south to north are: Cronulla SLSC, North Cronulla SLSC, Elouera SLSC and Wanda SLSC. The offshore rescue boat operated by the Cronulla District Lifesaver Rescue frequently assists in major marine rescues along the Sydney coast.

Culture 
Anthony Redmond claims the Shire has a reputation for insular localism that also manifests itself in surf culture, has a high conservative vote and is Sydney's second largest Bible belt.

 The National Rugby League football club, the Cronulla-Sutherland Sharks are the major local professional sports team. They have an average attendance of 12,000-15,000.
 North Cronulla Surf Life Saving club doubled as a police station in the television series White Collar Blue.
 The Sutherland Sharks Football Club is the Shires New South Wales Premier League 1 Team. 
 Southern Districts Rugby Club is the premier grade rugby union football club for the Sutherland Shire and are known as the "Rebels". 
 Sutherland Shire Football Association is the largest Football Association in the Southern Hemisphere
 Four winners of the world's biggest triathlon, the Ironman World Championships in Kailua-Kona Hawaii, call the Sutherland Shire home. Cronulla Triathlon Club athletes Greg Welch (1994), Michellie Jones (2006), Chris McCormack (2007 & 2010) and Craig Alexander (2008, 2009 & 2011). A resident of the Sutherland Shire won the race, considered the world's toughest one day sporting event, for six years running (2006-2011).
 The 1979 novel, Puberty Blues by Gabrielle Carey and Kathy Lette, is a teen novel about the lives of two girls from the lower middle class of the Sutherland Shire.
 The 1981 film Puberty Blues and the 2012 TV series Puberty Blues are both based on the novel and predominantly filmed around the Sutherland Shire, including Cronulla Beach and the southern campus of Caringbah High School.
 The television reality shows Sylvania Waters and The Shire follow the lives of residents in the Sutherland Shire.

Economy 
According to a National Institute of Economic and Industry Research profile in 2016, the Gross Regional Product of the Sutherland Shire is estimated to be $9.74 billion, 1.9% of NSW's Gross State Product.

Retail 

The biggest commercial areas in the Sutheland Shire are located at Miranda, Sylvania, Kirrawee, Caringbah and Cronulla. Miranda is the main retail and commercial centre of the Shire, being home to Westfield Miranda along with Lederer Miranda and Kiora Centre as the two nearby smaller shopping centres.

Southgate is another major shopping complex, located in Sylvania. Cronulla is also a popular retail and commercial centre, with numerous restaurants and cafes and a considerable number of surf stores and other clothing and fashion shops.

Other neighbourhood shopping centres have also developed at Bangor, Illawong, Kareela, Jannali, Yarrawarrah and Menai together with a small centre at Alfords Point. Gymea Shopping Village attracts many people, with a regional arts centre, Hazelhurst Regional Gallery and Arts Centre, and a cafe and restaurant scene.

Sister cities
Sutherland Shire maintains sister city relations with the following cities:
 Lakewood, Colorado, United States
 Chūō, Tokyo, Japan

There are also two informal relationships:
 Sutherland, Scotland, UK
 Bangor, Wales, UK

See also 

 Bangor Bypass
 Botany Bay
 Cronulla riots
 Cronulla sand dunes
 Puberty Blues
 The Shire

References

External links 

  Sutherland Shire Council
 Sutherland Shire Info
 Sutherland Shire Environment Centre
 

 
Local government areas in Sydney
Botany Bay
Georges River